is a professional scientific nonprofit organization of the civil engineering field of Japan. It was established as an incorporated association in 1914 and its offices are located in Yotsuya, Shinjuku, Tokyo. JSCE currently has 35,553 members.

References

External links 
JSCE (土木学会)
JSCE English Site

Civil engineering professional associations
Engineering societies
Professional associations based in Japan